Svetlana Căpățînă (2 October 1969 – 25 January 2022) was a Moldovan politician.

Biography
She served in the Parliament of Moldova from 23 July 2021, until her death from COVID-19 on 25 January 2022, at the age of 52.

References

1969 births
2022 deaths
Deaths from the COVID-19 pandemic in Moldova
21st-century Moldovan politicians
21st-century Moldovan women politicians
Members of the parliament of Moldova
Moldovan female MPs
Party of Communists of the Republic of Moldova politicians